Warren David Blosjo Jr. (born September 23, 1977) known professionally as Warren Kole, is an American actor known for his role as LAPD Detective Wes Mitchell on the USA Network original series Common Law. He also played Roderick on the FOX original series The Following in its first season, and starred as FBI Agent Robert Stahl in the NBC crime drama Shades of Blue. He also portrayed Rafe Adler in the video game Uncharted 4: A Thief's End.

Early life
Warren Kole was born in San Antonio, Texas, and spent much of his early life in the Washington, D.C. area. He studied acting at Boston University in Massachusetts where he began his career performing in local theater productions.

Career
Kole made his feature film debut in A Love Song for Bobby Long opposite John Travolta, Scarlett Johansson, and fellow USA Network star, Gabriel Macht.  He also starred as Addley Koffin opposite Rebecca De Mornay and Jaime King in the independent thriller Mother's Day, and he made an appearance in 2012 blockbuster The Avengers. He also had a role in the TV show Rizzoli & Isles. Kole had a recurring role as Roderick on the Fox series The Following.

Prior to his role on Common Law, he had recurring roles on the Fox series The Chicago Code, 24, and Mental. He also had a starring role as Robert Wheeler in the 6-part TNT miniseries Into the West, produced by Steven Spielberg and DreamWorks. He also starred in the "Pick Me Up" episode of Showtime's Masters of Horror anthology series.
He appears in the fifth season of the USA Network's White Collar.

In 2016, Kole began a supporting role as FBI Special Agent Robert Stahl on the NBC series Shades of Blue opposite Jennifer Lopez and Ray Liotta. Kole would then later portray Rafe Adler, main antagonist of the 2016 video game Uncharted 4: A Thief's End.

Kole began a series regular role on Showtime's Yellowjackets in 2021.

He portrayed Commander Phillip Graves in Call of Duty: Modern Warfare II in 2022.

Filmography

Film

Television

Video games

References

External links
 
 

1977 births
American male film actors
American male television actors
American male video game actors
Living people
Male actors from San Antonio